Ride with the Rasses is the fifth album by Jamaican reggae artist Lincoln Thompson. The album was released 1982.

Track listing
 "One Common Need"
 "Kinky Money Game"
 "Come Spring"
 "Fall Back"
 "The Brotherhood Of Man"
 "Ride With The Rasses"
 "No Future At All"

Personnel
 Drums: Michael "Boo" Richards
 Bass: Errol "Bagga" Walker
 Guitar: George Miller
 Lead Guitar: Lawrence White
 Keyboards: Pablo Black
 Percussion: Duke Ferron

1982 albums
Lincoln Thompson albums